The 2015 CAF Women's Olympic Qualifying Tournament was the fourth edition of the CAF Women's Olympic Qualifying Tournament, the quadrennial international football competition organised by the Confederation of African Football (CAF) to determine which women's national teams from Africa qualify for the Olympic football tournament.

The top two teams of the tournament qualified for the 2016 Summer Olympics women's football tournament in Brazil as the CAF representatives.

South Africa qualified for the second Olympics in a row, while Zimbabwe qualified for the first time.

Teams
A total of 18 CAF member national teams entered the qualifying rounds.

Format
Qualification ties were played on a home-and-away two-legged basis. If the aggregate score was tied after the second leg, the away goals rule would be applied, and if still level, extra time would be played. The away goals rule would again be applied after extra time, and if still level, the penalty shoot-out would be used to determine the winner.

The two winners of the fourth round qualified for the Olympic football tournament.

Schedule
The schedule of the qualifying rounds was as follows.

First round

|}

Note: Guinea-Bissau and Libya withdrew.

Liberia won on walkover.

Gabon won on walkover.

Second round

|}

Note: Liberia, Mali and Tunisia withdrew. Liberia because of administrative reasons, due to Ebola outbreak (initially to play home match in Cameroon). Nigeria versus Mali and Liberia versus Cameroon were to be played in early/mid-May so Nigeria and Cameroon were able to leave earlier for the World Cup.

Cameroon won on walkover.

Ghana won 4–1 on aggregate.

Ivory Coast won on walkover.

2–2 on aggregate. Zimbabwe won on away goals.

South Africa won 8–2 on aggregate.

2–2 on aggregate. Kenya won on away goals.

Nigeria won on walkover.

Equatorial Guinea won 7–0 on aggregate.

Third round

|}

Note: Zimbabwe failed to secure the necessary funds to travel for the first leg, and FIFA awarded the match 3–0 to Ivory Coast. It was initially indicated by the CAF that Ivory Coast won the tie and the second leg was cancelled, but this was overturned by FIFA. Ivory Coast then failed to show up for the original second leg, but they were not punished, and the second leg was rescheduled. Ivory Coast then withdrew from the tie before the rescheduled second leg.

3–3 on aggregate. Cameroon won on away goals.

Zimbabwe won on walkover.

South Africa won 2–0 on aggregate.

Equatorial Guinea won 3–2 on aggregate.

Fourth round
Winners qualified for 2016 Summer Olympics.

|}

2–2 on aggregate. Zimbabwe won on away goals.

South Africa won 1–0 on aggregate.

Qualified teams for Olympics
The following two teams from CAF qualified for the Olympic football tournament.

1 Bold indicates champion for that year. Italic indicates host for that year.

Goalscorers
5 goals

 Jade
 Jermaine Seoposenwe

3 goals

 Madeleine Ngono Mani
 Portia Boakye
 Rudo Neshamba

2 goals
 Sanah Mollo

1 goal

 Lesego Keleboge
 Refilwe Tholakele
 Christine Manie
 Agnès Nkada
 Engy Ahmed
 Genoveva Añonma
 Gloria Chinasa
 Dorine Chuigoué
 Jumária
 Yog Atouth Louise
 Winnie Mapangou
 Elizabeth Addo
 Jane Ayieyam
 Samira Suleman
 Mercy Myles
 Mary Kinuthia
 Dorcas Shikobe
 Halimatu Ayinde
 Ngozi Okobi
 Amanda Dlamini
 Refiloe Jane
 Rhoda Mulaudzi
 Lebogang Ramalepe
 Barbara Banda
 Hellen Mubanga
 Felistas Muzongondi

Note: One goal scored by Equatorial Guinea missing goalscorer information.

References

External links
Olympic Football Tournament Rio 2016, (Women) Qualifiers, CAFonline.com

2015
Caf
Women's Olympic Qualifying Tournament
Caf Women's Olympic Qualifying Tournament